The 2019 FIFA U-20 World Cup Final was the final match of the 2019 FIFA U-20 World Cup in Poland. The match was played at the Łódź Stadium, Łódź on 15 June 2019 and was contested by Ukraine and South Korea. Ukraine won the match after defeating South Korea 3–1. It was the first-ever title for them and for a post-Soviet state.

Road to the final

Match

Details

References

Final
2019
Ukraine national football team matches
South Korea national football team matches
Sports competitions in Łódź
21st century in Łódź